Linden Grove may refer to:

in England
Linden Grove is a street in southeast London (SE26)
Linden Grove is a street in southeast London (SE15)
Linden Grove is also a street in Milton Keynes (MK14)

in the United States (by state)
Linden Grove (Frederick, Maryland), listed on the National Register of Historic Places in Frederick County, Maryland
Linden Grove Township, St. Louis County, Minnesota
Linden Grove (Castle Shannon, Pennsylvania), listed on the National Register of Historic Places in Allegheny County, Pennsylvania

See also
Linden Grove Cemetery